Gorakhpur Mumbai Antyodaya Express is a weekly train which runs as train number 12597 from  to Mumbai CSMT and as train number 12598 from Mumbai CSMT to Gorakhpur Junction. This train is operated by North Eastern Railway zone of Indian Railways. It runs at an average speed of 60 km/h in both directions, covering in 27 hours.

Till 22 April 2019, it was run as the Jan Sadharan Express with ICF coach and later 23 April 2019 it's upgraded to LHB coach and runs as the Antyodaya Express.

Coaches
This train has 17 General Second class coaches and 2 luggage cars.
Coaches can be increased or decreased to meet demand.

Service

Traction
Both trains are hauled by a Bhusawal Electric Loco Shed-based WAP-4 locomotive on its entire journey.

Routing

Timing

12597 – Leaves Gorakhpur Junction every Tuesday at morning 8:30 hrs IST and reaches Mumbai CSMT on 2nd day at afternoon 12:20 hrs.
12598 – Leaves Mumbai CSMT every Wednesday at 13:30 hrs IST and reaches Gorakhpur Junction 2nd day at 18:35 hrs IST

References

http://m.indiarailinfo.com/train/23132/539/1620 India Rail Info
http://www.cr.indianrailways.gov.in/view_detail.jsp?lang=0&dcd=2498&id=0,4,268

Passenger trains originating from Gorakhpur
Transport in Mumbai
Jan Sadharan Express trains
Rail transport in Madhya Pradesh
Rail transport in Maharashtra
Rail transport in Delhi
Railway services introduced in 2015
Antyodaya Express trains